WMJT (96.7 FM, "96.7 Flash FM") is an American radio station licensed to serve the community of McMillan, Michigan. The station serves the Newberry, Michigan area. WMJT broadcasts a Rock format.

History
On October 31, 2018, WMJT changed their format from classic hits to hot adult contemporary, branded as "96.7 Flash FM".

Previous logo

Sources
Michiguide.com - WMJT History

External links

MJT
Hot adult contemporary radio stations in the United States
Radio stations established in 2006